John Anthony "Jack" Kyne (4 November 1904 - 23 December 1966) was the Roman Catholic Bishop of Meath, Ireland from 1947 to his death in 1966.

Early life and ministry 
Kyne was born in Longwood, County Meath on the 4 November 1904.  He won a scholarship to St Finian's College in Mullingar and later became a member of staff there.  Kyne studied for the priesthood at the Irish College in Rome and was ordained a priest of the Diocese of Meath  on 31 July 1927.
From 1930, including during World War II, he served as a vice-rector of the Pontifical Irish College in Rome.  In 1939 Pope Pius XII named him a Monsignor and further appointed him as Papal Chamberlain in 1940.

Episcopal Ministry 
Following his predecessors elevation to Archdiocese of Armagh in 1946, he was appointed Bishop of Meath on 29 June 1947, a position he held until his sudden death in Mullingar on 23 December 1966.

References

External links
 Website of the Diocese of Meath

1904 births
1966 deaths
People educated at St Finian's College
Pontifical Irish College alumni
Roman Catholic bishops of Meath
20th-century Roman Catholic bishops in Ireland